Badger Creek is a town in Victoria, Australia, 53 km north-east from Melbourne's central business district, located within the Shire of Yarra Ranges local government area.

Badger Creek is near the Healesville Sanctuary and the former Aboriginal reserve, Coranderrk, now known as the Coranderrk Bushland.

History
The creek was named after the wombats in the area which were often called badgers.

Badger Creek was surveyed as a township in 1894, but was not settled to any extent until some time later. The Coranderrk school opened in 1890, being replaced by the Badger Creek school in 1899. The Post Office opened around 1902 as Badger Creek State School, was renamed Badger Creek around 1907 and closed in 1930.

The weir in the Badger Creek reserve was constructed in 1909 and feeds water to the Silvan Reservoir.

See also
Coranderrk

References

External links
Australian Places - Badger Creek

Towns in Victoria (Australia)
Yarra Valley
Yarra Ranges